Denver Sylvester Dickerson (January 24, 1872 – November 28, 1925) was an American politician. He was the 11th governor of Nevada from 1908 to 1911. A member of the Silver – Democratic coalition party, he had previously held office as the 13th lieutenant governor of Nevada from 1907 to 1908. During his governorship, Dickerson worked to reform the state prison system.

After leaving office, Dickerson became the Superintendent of Federal Prisons, predecessor to the present-day Federal Bureau of Prisons. He was the warden of Nevada State Prison until his death in 1925.

Biography
Dickerson was born on January 24, 1872, to Harvey Franklin and Catherine Melinda Dickerson in Millville in Shasta County, California. His father was a mining pioneer in California. Dickerson received a public school education and was later privately tutored. Dickerson pursued mining in Idaho, Montana, and Nevada.

During the Spanish–American War in 1898, Dickerson was deployed as Sergeant of Troop D of the 2nd U.S. Volunteer Cavalry. Upon returning from his tour of duty as First Sergeant in 1899, Dickerson moved to White Pine County, Nevada.

Settlement in Nevada

In 1902, Dickerson was elected to his first office, the clerk of White Pine County and later became county recorder. On April 23, 1904, Dickerson married Una Reilly of Cherry Creek, Nevada, in a ceremony held in Eureka, Nevada. On November 24, 1904, Dickerson and Charles A. Walker acquired the White Pine News. By October 19, 1905, Dickerson was the newspaper's editor and sole proprietor.

State politics
In 1906, Dickerson decided to run for Lieutenant Governor of Nevada. While attending the Democratic State Convention in Reno as a young delegate, he discovered that no one was interested in running for the office. In May of that year, he handed over control of the White Pine News to Houlden Hudgins and sold it in the fall. On October 11, 1906, Dickerson founded the Ely Mining Expositor as a weekly paper representing the interests of the Silver-Democratic political coalition. Dickerson won the November election and took office in January 1907. The Ely Mining Expositor was helmed by various editors while Dickerson was in office and moved to daily publication by May 15, 1907.

When fellow Silver-Democrat and Governor John Sparks died in office on May 22, 1908, Dickerson became the acting governor. The Dickersons became the first family to move into the Nevada Governor's Mansion, recently completed at a cost of $22,700. On September 2, 1909, Una gave birth to June, the only child to be born in the mansion. During his gubernatorial tenure, Dickerson worked to restructure state mental hospitals and reform the state prison system. He also found support to reorganize the state Railroad Commission.

The "Fight of the Century"

In 1910, former undefeated boxing champion James J. Jeffries sought to reclaim the heavyweight championship as the "great white hope" from African-American Jack Johnson. Dickerson was impressed by Johnson's boxing skills and pledged to provide an opportunity for a match in Nevada without racial prejudice. Despite national pressure against staging the event, Dickerson allowed it to proceed in Reno. Promoter Tex Rickard assured Dickerson that it would be a fair fight. On July 4, 1910, Johnson defeated Jeffries, causing a wave of unrest across the country. In the election of November 1910, Dickerson was defeated and left office on January 2, 1911.

Later work
After leaving the governor's office, Dickerson was appointed superintendent of the Nevada State Police. In 1913, Dickerson was appointed the Warden of Nevada State Prison in Carson City to replace George W. Cowing, who had problems finding men willing to form a firing squad to execute convicted murderer Andriza Mircovich. The death sentence was eventually carried out by a custom-built shooting machine.

Dickerson took office as the Superintendent of Federal Prisons in January 1920 under U.S. President Woodrow Wilson. In September 1920, Jack Johnson was sent to the U.S. Penitentiary in Leavenworth, Kansas for incarceration while under Dickerson's administration. Dickerson worked to have Johnson paroled against unsubstantiated charges. Dickerson resigned on April 2, 1921, when newly elected President Warren G. Harding announced that he would appoint his brother-in-law Heber Herbert Votaw to the office.

In December 1923, Dickerson returned to Nevada State Prison. He supervised the execution of Gee Jon in February 1924, the first to be carried out by gas chamber in the United States. Dickerson remained warden until his death in November 1925.

Legacy

Dickerson was buried at Lone Mountain Cemetery in Carson City. Afterwards, his wife Una was appointed head librarian of the law library at the courthouse in Reno, Nevada. She later retired in Reno and died on April 9, 1959, and was buried next to her husband.

The Dickersons had eight children: Harvey, Norinne, June, Donald, Denver, Belford, Barbara and George. Their sons Harvey, Denver, and George followed their father's footsteps into Nevada state politics. Harvey Dickerson was elected Attorney General of Nevada in 1954 and ran unsuccessfully for governor in 1958.
Re-elected in 1962 and 1966, Dickerson became the only three time Attorney General of Nevada to serve bifurcated terms of office. The younger Denver Dickerson would go on to become the Speaker of the Nevada Assembly in 1943 and was appointed Secretary of Guam in 1963 by President John F. Kennedy. George M. Dickerson was elected District Attorney of Clark County, Nevada in 1954 and President of the State Bar of Nevada in 1973. George's older brother Harvey was the first of three Dickersons to serve as the president of the State Bar of Nevada in 1953. George's son Robert P. Dickerson was the third to serve in 1997.

Other offices and affiliations
 32nd degree Freemason
 Chairman of the Nevada Board of Education
 Nevada Board of Prison Commissioners and Insane Asylum
 President, Blaine Gold Mining and Milling Company
 President, Robinson Mining Company
 President, White Pine County Abstract and Guarantee Company
 Sagebrush Club (Carson City, Nevada)
 University Club (Ely, Nevada)

See also

 Capital punishment in Nevada
 List of United States political families (Dickersons of Nevada)

References

External links
 
 Denver Sylvester Dickerson at the National Governors Association
 Denver Sylvester Dickerson 1908-1910 at the Nevada State Library and Archives
 Nevada Governors' Biographical Information at the Nevada State Library and Archives
A Guide to the Dickerson saga, NC360. Special Collections, University Libraries, University of Nevada, Reno.

|-

1872 births
1925 deaths
American male journalists
American military personnel of the Spanish–American War
American police chiefs
American prison wardens
American publishers (people)
Democratic Party governors of Nevada
Journalists from California
Journalists from Nevada
Lieutenant Governors of Nevada
Military personnel from California
Military personnel from Nevada
Nevada Silverites
Politicians from Carson City, Nevada
People from Shasta County, California
Silver Party state governors of the United States
United States Army soldiers